Tetramethrin is a potent synthetic insecticide in the pyrethroid family.  It is a white crystalline solid with a melting point of 65-80 °C.  The commercial product is a mixture of stereoisomers.

It is commonly used as an insecticide, and affects the insect's nervous system.  It is found in many household insecticide products.

Tetramethrin has an expected half-life of 12.5-14 days in soil and 13-25 days in water.

References

External links
Pyrethrins and Pyrethroids Fact Sheet - National Pesticide Information Center
Pyrethrins and Pyrethroids Pesticide Information Profile - Extension Toxicology Network

Maleimides
Chrysanthemate esters
Household chemicals
Isoindoles